Waratah railway station is located on the Main Northern line in New South Wales, Australia. It serves the western Newcastle suburbs of Waratah and Mayfield.

History
Waratah station opened on 9 March 1858.

Platforms & services
Waratah has two side platforms. It is serviced by NSW TrainLink Hunter Line services travelling from Newcastle to Maitland, Muswellbrook, Scone, Telarah and Dungog.

Transport links
Newcastle Transport operates one route via Waratah station:
24: Wallsend to Marketown via Jesmond, University of Newcastle, Waratah, Carrington & Newcastle Interchange

References

External links

Waratah station details Transport for New South Wales

Easy Access railway stations in New South Wales
Railway stations in the Hunter Region
Railway stations in Australia opened in 1858
Regional railway stations in New South Wales
Main North railway line, New South Wales